George Skene (9 May 1749 – 27 April 1825), of Skene, was a Scottish army officer and politician.

Life
The eldest son of George Skene of Skene, George the younger was educated for the law, and became an advocate at the Scottish bar, although he never practised. He subsequently entered the army, and rose to the rank of captain in the 81st Highlanders in 1781, the year he succeeded his father in the estate of Skene.

Skene was a committed Whig and supporter of Charles James Fox. He was elected as the member of parliament (MP) for Aberdeenshire at a by-election in 1786, defeating the Tory James Ferguson,
but declined to contest the latter for the seat in 1790. He briefly returned to Parliament, representing Elgin Burghs, from 1806 to 1807.

His "violent" Whiggery and alcoholism much impaired his political career, but he remained influential in the public affairs of Aberdeenshire, in part due to his pleasant manner. Upon his death, he was succeeded by his brother Alexander Skene, who was deaf, dumb, and nearly blind; upon Alexander's death two years later, an entail enacted by George brought the Skene estates to his nephew, the Earl Fife.

At the end of his life he was living at 46 Moray Place in the fashionable Moray Estate on the west side of Edinburgh.

References

Sources

External links 
 

1749 births
1825 deaths
81st Regiment of Foot (Aberdeenshire Highland Regiment) officers
Whig (British political party) MPs
Members of the Parliament of Great Britain for Scottish constituencies
British MPs 1784–1790
Members of the Parliament of the United Kingdom for Scottish constituencies
UK MPs 1806–1807